The northern grosbeak-canary or Abyssinian grosbeak canary (Crithagra donaldsoni) is a species of passerine bird in the finch family Fringillidae. It is found in Ethiopia, Kenya, and Somalia. Its binomial name commemorates the explorer Arthur Donaldson Smith.

The northern grosbeak-canary was formerly placed in the genus Serinus but phylogenetic analysis using mitochondrial and nuclear DNA sequences found that the genus was polyphyletic. The genus was therefore split and a number of species including the northern grosbeak-canary were moved to the resurrected genus Crithagra.

References

northern grosbeak-canary
Birds of the Horn of Africa
northern grosbeak-canary
Taxonomy articles created by Polbot